Translation initiation factor eIF-2B subunit delta is a protein that in humans is encoded by the EIF2B4 gene.

References

Further reading